Pavel Prishivalko (born 25 July 1999) is a Belarusian professional footballer who plays for Minsk.

References

External links 
 
 

1999 births
Living people
Belarusian footballers
Association football goalkeepers
FC Minsk players